Our Cartoon President is an American adult animated satirical television series that premiered on February 11, 2018 and ended on November 8, 2020, on Showtime. The series was created by Stephen Colbert, Chris Licht, Matt Lappin, Tim Luecke, and R. J. Fried and is based on a recurring segment from Colbert's late night talk show The Late Show with Stephen Colbert.

In August 2019, it was announced that the series had been renewed for a third and final season, which premiered on January 26, 2020.

Premise
Our Cartoon President is based on a recurring segment of Stephen Colbert's The Late Show with Stephen Colbert. A workplace comedy taking place in the White House and other Washington D.C. locations, the show takes a look at the presidency of Donald Trump, his sycophants, his family members, members of Congress, and cable news-based newscasters and political commentators. The second season introduces the 2020 Democratic presidential candidates, as the focus of the show shifts to the 2020 election.

Cast and characters

Main

 Jeff Bergman as Donald Trump, Lou Dobbs, Joe Biden, Bill de Blasio, and John F. Kennedy
 Cody Lindquist as Melania Trump and Louise Linton
 William Sadler as John F. Kelly, Jeff Sessions, Mitch McConnell, Wilbur Ross and William Barr
 Emily Lynne as Ivanka Trump, Eric Trump, Karen Pence, Nancy Pelosi, Stormy Daniels, Theresa May, Elizabeth II, and Ann Coulter
 John Viener as Mike Pence, God, and Howard Schultz
 Gabriel Gundacker as Donald Trump Jr., Stephen Miller, Jake Tapper, and Brian Kilmeade
 Griffin Newman as Jared Kushner
 Jennifer F. Jackson as Sarah Huckabee Sanders (episodes 11–46), Maggie Haberman, Kellyanne Conway, and Susan Collins
 Molly Gordon as Sarah Huckabee Sanders (episodes 1–10)
 Jim Santangeli as H. R. McMaster and Fred Trump
 James Adomian as Ted Cruz, Sean Hannity, Alex Jones, Bill Clinton, Rudy Giuliani, Sebastian Gorka, Benjamin Franklin, Mike Lindell, Bernie Sanders, and Elon Musk
 Zach Cherry as Ben Carson, Colin Kaepernick and Evander Holyfield

Recurring

 Amanda Phillipson as Rachel Maddow and Kimberly Guilfoyle
 Stephen Colbert as Wolf Blitzer and Wilson Livingood (Season 1 premiere and Season 3 premiere)
 Brett Davis as Anderson Cooper
 Katie Rich as Betsy DeVos and Ruth Bader Ginsburg
 Mike Leech as Paul Ryan and Tim Pawlenty
 Anna Eilinsfeld as Ainsley Earhardt and Kristen Welker
 Thomas Whittington as Chuck Schumer, Emmanuel Macron, Tucker Carlson, and Beto O'Rourke
 R.J. Fried as Steve Doocy, Vladimir Putin, Chris Cuomo, and Stephen Breyer
 Zach Smilovitz as Steve Mnuchin, John R. Bolton, and Chuck Todd
 Paul Christie as Jim Mattis
 Jen Spyra as Hillary Clinton
 Eliana Kwartler as Angela Merkel, Hope Hicks and Marianne Williamson
 Mike MacRae as Mitt Romney and Joe Manchin
 Matt Rogers as Bill Shine, Pete Buttigieg and Ben Shapiro
 Jack McBrayer as Lindsey Graham
 Alise Morales as Alexandria Ocasio-Cortez
 Godfrey (season 1) as Cory Booker and Barack Obama
 Dean Edwards (season 2–3) as Cory Booker
 Iman Crosson (season 2–3) as Barack Obama
 Bob Powers as Mike Pompeo
 Ben Siemon as Tagg Romney
 Tim Robinson as Brett Kavanaugh
 Joe Cassidy as John Roberts
 Allie Levitan as Elizabeth Warren
 Matthew Piazzi as Jim Acosta and George Stephanopoulos
 Kate Villa as Amy Klobuchar and Elena Kagan
 Yoshi Amao as Shinzo Abe
 Ziwe Fumudoh as Kamala Harris

Guest

 Arthur Lai as Xi Jinping
 Aaron Landon as Justin Trudeau
 James Monroe Iglehart as Barack Obama (singing)
 Thomas Berkley as Rex Tillerson
 Grace Edwards as Omarosa Manigault Newman and Michelle Obama
 David Slavin as Sean Conley
 Jason Kravits as Michael Bloomberg
 Sam Freed as Ronny Jackson
 Jonathan Van Ness as himself
 Kathryn Allison as Aretha Franklin
 Brian Stack as Ronald Reagan
 John Thibodeaux as Lester Holt
 Michael Shannon as Midterms Trump ad narrator
 Matt Lucas as Boris Johnson
 Nathan Min as Andrew Yang

Episodes

Production

Background

The series is a spin-off from The Late Show with Stephen Colbert, which, since 2016, had featured a series of sketches featuring a cartoon caricature of Trump designed by Tim Luecke and voiced by Brian Stack. The sketches used Adobe Character Animator software to allow Colbert to interact with the character in real-time. The character was also featured in an animated short during Colbert's election night special for Showtime.

Development
Following the online success of the sketches, Late Show showrunner Chris Licht suggested to Tim Luecke and Matt Lappin that they develop the concept into its own television series. In their pitch to Showtime, Luecke and Lappin described the potential series as a look "behind the scenes at the White House" and that their goal would be to "produce it as quickly as we possibly could so that we could begin to keep up with the news cycle."

On July 27, 2017, Showtime announced that it had greenlit an animated series based on the sketches, with Colbert, Matt Lappin and Chris Licht as executive producers. On December 18, 2017, it was announced that the series would premiere on February 11, 2018. On March 8, 2018, Showtime announced that they were ordering an additional seven episodes of the series that are set to air during the summer of 2018. This order would bring the first season total of episodes up to seventeen. On May 30, 2018, it was announced that the additional seven episodes of season one would premiere on July 15, 2018. On August 22, 2018, it was announced that Showtime had greenlit a midterm elections themed television special from the series titled "Our Cartoon President: Election Special 2018". The episode was scheduled to air on November 4, 2018 and expected to feature appearances from the cartoon versions of Vladimir Putin, Rudy Giuliani, Bill Clinton, Hillary Clinton, and Barack Obama. On January 22, 2019, it was announced that Showtime had renewed the series for a second season consisting of ten episodes.  On January 26, 2020, the first part of the third season was aired, consisting of ten more episodes.  On July 29, 2020, Showtime announced in a video that the show would be returning on September 20, 2020 with the second half of Season 3, featuring new characters, such as Cartoon Jill Biden, Cartoon Dr. Anthony Fauci, and Cartoon Andrew Cuomo.

Colbert said during the 2020 presidential election that if Trump won a second term, the series would be renewed for a fourth season. However, Trump lost reelection and the series was therefore not renewed, with Colbert and the team moving to other projects.

Release

Marketing
On December 18, 2017, Showtime released the first teaser trailer for the series. On May 30, 2018, a trailer for the additional seven episodes of season one was released. On October 31, 2018, a trailer for the "Our Cartoon President: Election Special 2018" television special was released.

2018 White House Correspondents' Dinner
On April 28, 2018, a special three-minute video created by the cast and crew of the series aired during the 2018 White House Correspondents Dinner.

Home media
On December 18, 2018, the first season was released on DVD by CBS Home Entertainment and Paramount Home Media Distribution featuring all eighteen episodes and the mid-term election special. The release also includes numerous bonus features such as episode commentary tracks, a featurette looking at the animation process, footage from the table read for episode eleven, and clips from The Late Show with Stephen Colbert, Stephen Colbert's 2016 Election Special, and The White House Correspondent's Dinner. The second season was released on DVD on October 13, 2020.

Reception
The first season of Our Cartoon President has been met with a mixed to negative response from critics upon its premiere. On the review aggregation website Rotten Tomatoes, the first season holds a 32% approval rating with an average rating of 5.17 out of 10 based on 25 reviews. The website's critical consensus reads, "Sugar-coated satire, Our Cartoon President wavers between scathing social criticism and softball slings in a way that's as unsatisfying as it is uncomfortable." Metacritic, which uses a weighted average, assigned the season a score of 42 out of 100 based on 11 critics, indicating "mixed or average reviews".

Jack Nevins of The Guardian praised the show, calling it a farce that "nailed the Trump drama," and contrasting the show's surreal workplace comedy approach with the more reality and headline-driven approach of other late night comedy shows. In contrast, USA Today critic Kelly Lawler reviewed Our Cartoon President negatively, describing it as "slight, dated and unsustainable". She also concluded that "Watching one episode is enough to get the point. Watching nine more feels unnecessary." Ben Travers of Indiewire also reviewed the show unfavorably, calling it "a pointless, unfunny drudge" and criticized it for "humanizing" Trump. In a mixed review, Brian Lowry of CNN wrote that "While Our Cartoon President certainly has its moments, the best news for Showtime might be it's only stuck with this experiment in quick-turnaround animation, at least initially, for 10 weeks." He also said that the show suffered from many of the same problems as That's My Bush!, a sitcom produced in 2001 satirizing the presidency of George W. Bush. Matt Wilstein of The Daily Beast was more favorable, writing that "The biggest surprise [of the show] is how hilarious it is" and praising the show for being "remarkably adept at boiling down characters to their core traits, from Trump and his family to members of his Cabinet and Congress to the Fox News personalities he spends most of his day watching".

References

External links
 
 

2018 American television series debuts
2020 American television series endings
2010s American adult animated television series
2010s American political comedy television series
2010s American satirical television series
2010s American sitcoms
2010s American workplace comedy television series
2020s American adult animated television series
2020s American political comedy television series
2020s American satirical television series
2020s American sitcoms
2020s American workplace comedy television series
American adult animated comedy television series
American adult animated television spin-offs
American animated sitcoms
American flash adult animated television series
Animated satirical television series
Animation based on real people
Caricature
Cultural depictions of Bill Clinton
Cultural depictions of Hillary Clinton
Cultural depictions of Barack Obama
Cultural depictions of Joe Biden
Cultural depictions of Angela Merkel
English-language television shows
Fiction about God
Narcissism in television
Parodies of Donald Trump
Political satirical television series
Showtime (TV network) original programming
Stephen Colbert
The Late Show with Stephen Colbert
Television series by CBS Studios
Television series by CBS Eye Animation Productions
Television series about presidents of the United States
Television shows set in Washington, D.C.
White House in fiction